Ross Farm may refer to:

in Canada
Ross Farm Museum, near New Ross, Nova Scotia

in the United States
Ross Farm (Northampton, Massachusetts), listed on the NRHP in Massachusetts
John Ross Farm, Leroy, IN, listed on the NRHP in Indiana
Frank L. Ross Farm, North Bethlehem, PA, listed on the NRHP in Pennsylvania

See also
Ross House (disambiguation)